Baby Haifa is the fifth album by Lebanese singer Haifa Wehbe. It was released in March 2010 exclusively for youngsters under Rotana Records. The album contains eight songs, sung in Lebanese and Egyptian dialects. Baby Haifa songs can be listened to on Haifa Wehbe Music Radio which streams 24/7 live music for Haifa.

Track listing
01 Ya Toto

02 Baba Fein

03 El Wawah

04 Naughty

05 Lamma El Shams

06 Baoussi

07 Aklok Mnin Ya Battah

08 Hek Al Mama

References

2010 albums
Rotana Records albums
Haifa Wehbe albums
Arabic-language albums